Maserati competed in Grand Prix racing from 1931 to 1957.

Complete European Championship results
(key) (Races in bold indicate pole position) (results in italics indicate fastest lap)
Notes
 – Indicates shared drive, no points for the driver who took over.

Formula One

Works team entries
These are the complete World Championship Grand Prix results for Officine Alfieri Maserati, the works Maserati team.
(key)
Notes
  – The Constructors World Championship did not exist before .
 † Indicates shared drive

Results of other Maserati cars
(key)
† Indicates shared drive

As an engine supplier
(key)
  – The Constructors World Championship did not exist before .
  – Ineligible for Constructors World Championship points.

References

Formula One constructor results
Maserati in motorsport